NGC 276 is a barred spiral galaxy located approximately 626 million light-years from the Solar System in the constellation Cetus. It was discovered in 1886 by Frank Muller and was later also observed by DeLisle Stewart.

John Dreyer, creator of the New General Catalogue describes the object as "extremely faint, pretty small, extended 265°, 11 magnitude star 3 arcmin to north". The galaxy's right ascension was later corrected in the Index Catalogue using the observation data by Stewart.

See also 
 List of NGC objects (1–1000)
 Pisces (constellation)

References

External links 
 
 SEDS

0276
03054
Barred spiral galaxies
?
Cetus (constellation)
Discoveries by Frank Muller (astronomer)